Hondius can refer to two possibly unrelated families of engravers and cartographers, who both moved from Flanders to the Dutch Republic in the 1590s:

 Amsterdam family originating from Ghent:
 Jodocus Hondius (1563–1612)
 Jodocus Hondius II (1593–1629), first son of Jodocus I
 Hendrik Hondius II (1597–1651), second son of Jodocus I
 The Hague family originating from Duffel:
 Hendrik Hondius I (1573–1650)
 Willem Hondius (c. 1598–1650s), one of his sons
 Hendrik Hondius III (1615–1677), another son